The dactylic pentameter is a verse-form which, in classical Greek and Latin poetry, follows a dactylic hexameter to make up an elegiac couplet. It consists of two halves, each consisting of two dactyls, for which spondees can be substituted in the first half only, followed by a longum. Thus the line most normally looks as follows (note that "—" marks a long syllable, "∪" a short syllable and " ∪ ∪ " either one long or two shorts):

     |— ∪ ∪ | — ∪ ∪ | — || — ∪ ∪ | — ∪ ∪ | —     

As in all classical verse-forms, the phenomenon of brevis in longo is observed, so the last syllable can actually be short or long. Also, the line has a diaeresis, where a word-boundary must occur, after the first half-line, here marked ||.

"Pentameter" may seem a slightly strange term for this meter, as it seems to have six parts, but the reason is that each half of the line has two and a half feet, the two together thus making up five. Each half-line is called a hemiepes (half-epic), as resembling half a line of epic dactylic hexameter.

The pentameter is notable for its very tight structure, with substitutions allowed only in the first two feet. It seldom, if ever, occurs except in elegiac couplets.

See also
Prosody (Latin)

References

External links
 Meter and Scansion with several Latin verse forms.

Types of verses

pl:Dystych elegijny